Mian Yawar Saeed (22 January 1935 – 21 October 2015) was a Pakistani cricketer, who played 50 first-class matches for Somerset County Cricket Club and nine matches for a variety of teams based in Pakistan between 1953 and 1959.  A right-handed batsman and right-arm medium pace bowler, he claimed 106 career wickets.

Saeed was appointed Pakistan cricket team manager but after Pakistan's scandal-filled England tour, including match fixing allegations against team members, and after losing all three series against England he resigned from his post on 27 September 27, 2010.

On 21 October 2015, Saeed died of a brain tumour in Lahore aged 80.

He was the father of Mohammad Saeed and Taimur Saeed and father-in-law of Raza Rabbani.

References

External links
 

1935 births
2015 deaths
Pakistani cricketers
Somerset cricketers
East Pakistan cricketers
Punjab (Pakistan) cricketers
Cricketers from Lahore
Central Zone (Pakistan) cricketers
Deaths from brain cancer in Pakistan